Julian Ratei (born July 12, 1988) is a German footballer who played in the 3. Liga for SV Darmstadt 98.

External links

1988 births
Living people
German footballers
Germany youth international footballers
SV Darmstadt 98 players
TSV 1860 Munich II players
3. Liga players
Association football fullbacks
Sportspeople from Bayreuth
Footballers from Bavaria